The Australian Consortium for Interferometric Gravitational Astronomy (ACIGA) is a collaboration of Australian research institutions involved in the international gravitational wave research community.

The institutions associated with ACIGA are:
 The Australian National University
 University of Western Australia
 University of Adelaide
 Monash University
 University of Melbourne
 CSIRO optical technology group
 Charles Sturt University

See also
AIGO

References

External links 
ACIGA Home Page
The Centre for Gravitational Physics at the Australian National University
The Australian International Gravitational Research Centre at the University of Western Australia
Optics research group at the University of Adelaide
High Optical Power Test Facility located near Gingin, Western Australia
The School of Computing and Mathematics at Charles Sturt University

Astronomy in Australia
Gravitational-wave astronomy